Anderson Lake, also known as Anderson Reservoir, is an artificial lake in Morgan Hill, located in southern Santa Clara County, California. The reservoir is formed by the damming of Coyote Creek just below its confluence with Las Animas Creek. A  county park surrounds the reservoir and provides limited fishing ("catch and release"), picnicking, and hiking activities. Although swimming is prohibited, boating, water-skiing, and jet-skiing are permitted in the reservoir.

The California Office of Environmental Health Hazard Assessment has issued a safety advisory for any fish caught in Anderson Lake due to elevated levels of mercury and PCBs.

History 
The reservoir was created in 1950 by the construction of the Anderson Dam across Coyote Creek in the foothills of the Diablo Mountains east of Morgan Hill. The reservoir and dam were named after Leroy Anderson, a key founder and first president of the Santa Clara Valley Water District. It is the largest reservoir owned by the district.

Risk of dam failure
In January 2009, a preliminary routine seismic study suggested a small chance that a large-magnitude earthquake (6.6 with the dam at the epicenter, or 7.2 up to a mile away) could result in flooding in Morgan Hill and as far away as San Jose. In response, the Santa Clara Valley Water District (SCVWD) lowered the water level to 74 percent of capacity and announced a further analysis of the situation, which could possibly result in retrofitting the dam if necessary. In response SCVWD has lowered the water to 54% full, which is  feet below the dam crest.

In July 2011, SCVWD issued a report stating that the seismic stability study on Anderson Dam was completed. The storage restriction that has been in place since October 2010 was adjusted, allowing 12 additional feet of storage, which measures 68 percent of the dam's capacity, up from 57 percent. The water district initiated a capital project for a seismic retrofit by the end of 2018. The operating restriction was to remain in place until the project was complete. Remediation of the problem will cost as much as US$100 million.

In December 2016, SCVWD reported that further geotechnical analysis indicated that considerably more work would need to be performed on the dam, effectively removing it and rebuilding it. The existing dam had been built on alluvial deposits, which could liquefy during an earthquake. Accordingly, the estimated cost rose to US$400 million and the start of work was rescheduled to 2020, with completion planned for 2023–2024.

After years of additional studies and interim actions, the Federal Energy Regulatory Commission dismissed the Water District's plans as insufficient to address the risk of catastrophic failure and ordered on February 20, 2020, that lowering of the reservoir to deadpool storage begin no later than October 1. The letter noted that the district's "actions to date do not demonstrate an appropriate sense of urgency" regarding the risk of catastrophic failure in the case of an earthquake.

In 2020, the reservoir was drained, to 3% of its capacity. This will enable the water district to disassemble and rebuild the dam. It has the effect of increasing San Jose's reliance on imported water.

San Jose flooding 

On February 21, 2017, during the 2017 California floods, the reservoir reached as high as 104% of capacity, creating a large flow over the spillway into Coyote Creek, which overflowed and flooded the Rock Springs/Summerside, Olinder, Naglee Park, Roosevelt, Wooster-Tripp and Berryessa neighborhoods of San Jose along US Highway 101 between the reservoir and the south San Francisco Bay.

Anderson Dam 
The reservoir itself is situated parallel to the Calaveras Fault, which runs from Hollister to Milpitas.

Anderson Lake County Park 
The  Anderson Lake County Park is managed by the Santa Clara County Parks and Recreation Department. In addition to the county's largest reservoir is the Coyote Creek Parkway multiple-use trails, the Jackson Ranch historic park site, the Moses L. Rosendin Park, the Burnett Park area, and Anderson Lake Visitors Center.

See also
List of lakes in California
List of lakes in the San Francisco Bay Area
List of dams and reservoirs in California

References

External links
Detailed plan to drain lake
1995, 1982, 1983 Anderson Dam spillover video

External links
Waterfall during the 2017 California floods 

Reservoirs in Santa Clara County, California
Reservoirs in California
Reservoirs in Northern California